The turquoise-crowned hummingbird or Doubleday's hummingbird (Cynanthus doubledayi) is a species of hummingbird in the "emeralds", tribe Trochilini of subfamily Trochilinae. It is endemic to Mexico.

Taxonomy and systematics

The International Ornithological Committee (IOC), the Clements taxonomy, and BirdLife International's Handbook of the Birds of the World consider the turquoise-crowned hummingbird to be a species. 
The turquoise-crowned hummingbird is monotypic: no subspecies are recognised.

Description

The Cornell Lab of Ornithology's Birds of the World does not describe the turquoise-crowned hummingbird separately from the broad-billed hummingbird. The following is a Google translation of the original description's French:

"Male adult: straight beak, dilated at its base, white, and black at its extremity; round head; green cap, very brilliante has azure reflections; neck, scapular, back, cover caudal fin glossy dark green; throat, front and sides of the neck, ėpi-gastre covered with shiny bright blue scaly feathers, abdomen less blue and green on the sides; downy anal region White; slightly curved grey-black wings; cordate [notched] tail with wide and rounded rectrices, black-blue, the 4 middle ones ashy at their ends; bare black legs."

Distribution and habitat

The turquoise-crowned hummingbird is found in the southern Mexican states of Guerrero, Oaxaca, and Chiapas. It inhabits a variety of landscapes including arid thorn, tropical deciduous, gallery, and secondary forests. It occasionally occurs in pine-oak woodlands and grassy slopes.

Behavior

Movement

The turquoise-crowned hummingbird is a year-round resident throughout its range.

Food and feeding

The diet of the turquoise-crowned hummingbird is not separately described from that of the broad-billed hummingbird. In general, and like most hummingbirds, that species feeds on a wide variety of flowering plants and also small arthropods. The turquoise-crowned hummingbird is described as trap-lining for nectar in gallery forest.

Breeding

The turquoise-crowned hummingbird appears to nest throughout the year; its peak season is unknown. Other information on its breeding phenology is not separated in the Birds of the World account.

Vocalization

The turquoise-crowned hummingbird's vocalizations have not been separately described from those of the broad-billed hummingbird. That species' song, sung only by males, "[b]egins with short chip note, then a series of similar notes ranging in frequency from 2 to 13 kHz."

Status

The IUCN has assessed the turquoise-crowned hummingbird as being of Least Concern. Though its population size is not known it is believed to be stable. No specific threats have been identified. "Resident populations [of broad-billed hummingbird]] in Mexico might...be impacted by habitat loss, but this has not been studied."

References

Turquoise-crowned hummingbird
Birds of Mexico
Endemic birds of Mexico
Turquoise-crowned hummingbird